The COVID-19 pandemic in the Bahamas is part of the COVID-19 pandemic of coronavirus disease 2019 (COVID-19). The outbreak was identified in Wuhan, Hubei, China, in December 2019, declared to be a Public Health Emergency of International Concern on 30 January 2020, and recognised as a pandemic by the World Health Organization on 11 March 2020. It was confirmed to have reached the Bahamas on 15 March 2020 with the announcement of the first case.

COVID-19 is an infectious disease caused by severe acute respiratory syndrome coronavirus 2 (SARS-CoV-2). The case fatality rate for COVID-19 has been much lower than for other coronavirus respiratory infections such as SARS and MERS, but the transmission has been significantly greater, with a significant total death toll.


Timeline

March 2020
On March 15, Acting Minister of Health Jeffrey Lloyd announced the first confirmed case, a 61-year-old female.

On March 20, Prime Minister Hubert Minnis announced a 9pm to 5am curfew, restrictions on private gatherings, and closure of most in-person businesses, with limited hours for food stores and farmers' markets, pharmacies, gas stations, laundromats, banks, construction, and restaurants (limited to take-out only). Essential workers for the government, utilities, and media were exempted, as were health care providers and suppliers. The airport remained open, but only essential travel was allowed on public buses.

April 2020
On 5 April, the Queen of the Bahamas addressed the Commonwealth in a televised broadcast, in which she asked people to "take comfort that while we may have more still to endure, better days will return". She added, "we will be with our friends again; we will be with our families again; we will meet again".

On April 19, the prime minister announced that wearing a mask or covering one's face with clothing is mandatory in public. Employers must provide their employees who are serving the general public with masks.

May 2020
On May 21, authorities are maintaining various restrictions across the islands in order to slow the spread of COVID-19. A daily 24-hour curfew on weekdays and weekend lockdowns are from 2100 on Fridays to 0500 on Mondays. The island of Bimini is under complete lockdown at least through May 30. Under the 24 hour curfew, the residents can only leave their homes for essential purposes or for an emergency.

Cases by islands

Statistics

New cases and deaths per day

Active cases per day

See also 
 Caribbean Public Health Agency
 COVID-19 pandemic in North America
 COVID-19 pandemic by country and territory

References

coronavirus pandemic
coronavirus pandemic
Bahamas
Bahamas
Health in the Bahamas